The Aleksinac oil shale deposit is an oil shale deposit located in Aleksinac, Nišava District, Serbia. The deposit has oil shale reserves amounting to 2 billion tonnes, one of the largest oil shale reserves in Serbia and Europe and has an organic content equivalent to 200 million tonnes of shale oil.

References 

Oil shale deposits in Serbia
Nišava District